Onoto is a town in the eastern Venezuelan state of Anzoátegui.  This town is the shire town of the Juan Manuel Cajigal Municipality and, according to the 2001 Venezuelan census, the municipality has a population of 12,358.

Demographics
The Juan Manuel Cajigal Municipality, according to the 2001 Venezuelan census, has a population of 12,358 (down from 14,183 in 1990).  This amounts to 1% of Anzoátegui's population.

Government
Onoto is the shire town of the Juan Manuel Cajigal Municipality in Anzoátegui.  The mayor of the Juan Manuel Cajigal Municipality is Mardo Marcano, reelected in 2004 with 32% of the vote.  The last municipal election was held in October 2004.

References

External links
juancajigal-anzoategui.gob.ve 

Populated places in Anzoátegui